Balance of Power is a novel by Brian Stableford published in 1979.

Plot summary
Balance of Power is a novel in which the planetfalls of the 'recontact' ship Daedalus continue.

Reception
Dave Pringle reviewed Balance of Power for Imagine magazine, and stated that "this is a fairly humdrum example of Stableford's work. There is too much jungle-adventure and piracy-on-the-high-seas stuff in this book for it to succeed as SF."

Reviews
Review by Mary Gentle (1984) in Interzone, #8 Summer 1984

References

1979 novels